The Magic Behind the Voices: A Who's Who of Cartoon Voice Actors is a 367-page book by Tim Lawson and Alisa Persons, chronicling the artistic achievements and history of cartoon voice actors from the past and the present.

It was published by the University Press of Mississippi in December 2004.

Drawn from dozens of personal interviews, the book features various biographies, anecdotes, credit listings, and photographs pertaining to thirty-nine of the hidden artists of show business. The featured biographies span many animation studios and production companies, and discuss many details about well-known and distinguished voice actors, such as Beavis and Butthead and King of the Hill creator and lead voice artist Mike Judge, who got his start as an engineer for a weapons contractor); Bart Simpson's voice actress Nancy Cartwright, an Ohio native who became the star protégé of Daws Butler (voice artist for Yogi Bear, Huckleberry Hound, and Quick Draw McGraw); and Wayne Allwine and Russi Taylor, the real-life husband-and-wife duo who, at the time of this book's publication, were the current voice actors for Mickey and Minnie Mouse, respectively.

In the earliest days of cartoons, voice actors were seldom credited for their work, and prior to 1990, voice actors' potential as real actors was overlooked even by the Screen Actors Guild, with Mel Blanc, the so-named "Man of 1,000 Voices," being the only voice actor known to the general public.

Now, Oscar-winning celebrities clamor to guest star on animated television shows and features (often to the displeasure of dedicated voice actors such as Billy West); however, despite the crushing turnouts at signings for such television series as Animaniacs, The Simpsons, and SpongeBob SquarePants, most voice actors, even in 21st-century animation, continue to work in relative anonymity.

See also
I Know That Voice, the 2013 documentary about famous voice actors

References

External links
Homepage

Magic Behind the Voices, The
Magic Behind the Voices, The
Magic Behind the Voices, The
Voice acting
Animation fandom